Emmett High School is a four-year public secondary school in Emmett, Idaho, the only traditional high school in the Emmett School District #221. The school colors are royal blue and white and the mascot is a husky. Red is the accent color.

Athletics 

Emmett competes in athletics in IHSAA Class 4A in the Southern Idaho Conference (4A).

ALL RECORDS ARE FROM THE IHSAA WEBSITE UNLESS OTHERWISE NOTED

Boys' Football
2015 3A State Football champions.

Boys' basketball
1940 Class A Boys' State Basketball Champions
1965 3A Boys' State Basketball Champions

Girls' basketball
2016 3A State Girls' Basketball Champions

Volleyball
1996 3A State Champions

Softball
2002 4A State Champions
2011 4A State Champions  (introduced in 1997)

Baseball
1998 Boys' 4A State Champions

Boys' track
1945 One Class Boys' State Track Champions

Girls' track
1974 Class A State Track Champions
1981 3A State Track Champions
1983 3A State Track Champions
1997 A4 State Track Champions
2005 4A State Track Champions

Cross country
1995 A4 Boys’ State Cross Country Champion

Soccer

Debate team records
1942 State Debate Champions

Dance team

Drama team

References

External links

Emmett School District #221

Public high schools in Idaho
Schools in Gem County, Idaho